The Forester is a Grade II listed public house at Leighton Road, Northfields, Ealing, London.

It is on the Campaign for Real Ale's National Inventory of Historic Pub Interiors.

It was built in 1909 by the architect Nowell Parr.

References

Grade II listed buildings in the London Borough of Ealing
Grade II listed pubs in London
Pubs in the London Borough of Ealing
Buildings by Nowell Parr
National Inventory Pubs